Albert Gerald Lewis,  (10 April 1918 – 14 December 1982) was a South African fighter pilot and fighter ace who scored an ace in a day during the Battle of Britain, later being featured in a Life magazine article about the Battle of Britain.

Early life
Born in Kimberley on 10 April 1918, Lewis attended Kimberley Boys' High School.

Royal Air Force career
Lewis joined the Royal Air Force when he was 20. He flew with No. 616 Squadron at the outbreak of hostilities as a ferry pilot and then moved to No. 504 Squadron, flying Hurricanes. He then moved to No. 85 Squadron in France in April 1940. On 19 May he shot down five enemy aircraft before he was himself shot down over Lille.

On 29 April Lewis married Betty Yvonne Coxon at St. Paul's Church, Whiteshill, Stroud, where he would later farm.

In June 1940 Lewis was awarded the Distinguished Flying Cross (DFC).

On 18 August 1940 Lewis probably destroyed a Bf 110 and on the 31st a Bf 109.

No. 249 Squadron

Lewis then joined No. 249 Squadron on 15 September 1940. On the same day he shot down a He 111 and on the 18th a Bf 109 (his twelfth confirmed enemy aircraft). On 27 September he claimed six kills (three Bf 109s, two Bf 110s and a Ju 88), two probables and one damaged. While on a patrol on 28 September he was shot down and he baled out of his Hurricane over Faversham and was taken to Faversham Cottage Hospital, blind for two weeks, and with shrapnel in his legs with severe burns on the face, throat, hands and legs

Lewis returned to the squadron in December 1940, having been promoted flight lieutenant on 29 November. He was flying by 17 January 1941, and became "A" Flight Commander, and was awarded a Bar to his DFC.

Overseas service
Lewis volunteered for overseas service and was posted to No. 261 Squadron in January 1942. Via Sierra Leone he went to Trincomalee in China Bay, Ceylon to take command of No. 261 Squadron

On return to Britain he was made Chief Flying instructor at Tealing in Scotland and then went to No. 10 Group HQ at Box in Wiltshire in 1944–45. He left the Royal Air Force in 1946, having been an acting squadron leader since 22 April 1943. His final tally was 18 kills.

After the war
After the war Lewis went to the Royal Agricultural College in Cirencester. In 1947 he returned to South Africa and in 1951 joined the Tobacco Research Board in Southern Rhodesia. In 1953 he became a member of the Church of Jesus Christ of Latterday Saints (Mormons) and during 1953–55 he studied in the United States, but returned to farm in England in 1957.

References

1918 births
1982 deaths
People from Kimberley, Northern Cape
Recipients of the Distinguished Flying Cross (United Kingdom)
Royal Air Force squadron leaders
Royal Air Force pilots of World War II
South African World War II flying aces
The Few